Hannah is a 1997 Austrian thriller film directed by Reinhard Schwabenitzky. The film was selected as the Austrian entry for the Best Foreign Language Film at the 69th Academy Awards, but was not accepted as a nominee.

Cast
 Elfi Eschke as Hannah Fischer
 August Zirner as Wolfgang Heck
 Jürgen Hentsch as Thomas Hochstedt
 Paul Herwig as Helge Hochstedt

See also
 List of submissions to the 69th Academy Awards for Best Foreign Language Film
 List of Austrian submissions for the Academy Award for Best Foreign Language Film

References

External links
 

1997 films
1997 thriller films
1990s German-language films
Austrian thriller films